Veronica catarractae, the waterfall parahebe, is a species of flowering plant in the family Plantaginaceae, native to New Zealand. Under its synonym Parahebe catarractae, its cultivar 'Delight' has gained the Royal Horticultural Society's Award of Garden Merit.

References

catarractae
Endemic flora of New Zealand
Flora of the North Island
Flora of the South Island
Plants described in 1786